Resistiré (International Title: Forever Julia) is a 2003 Argentine telenovela.  This serial features a gorgeous woman torn between her terrorist fiancee and a handsome tailor.  It starred Pablo Echarri, Celeste Cid, Carolina Fal and Fabián Vena.

Resistiré was a major hit on Argentinian television. It dared to introduce new elements in the genre of telenovela and was well accepted by the audience, setting a new standard in TV. In 2004, the telenovela won the Martín Fierro Award as the best show of the year, along with many other awards.
In 2007, Portuguese remake debuted. SIC produced a Portuguese version titled Resistirei.

In 2006, two remakes debuted. MyNetworkTV produced an American version in English titled Watch Over Me.  In addition, Televisa unveiled Amar Sin Limites (Love Without Limits) for Mexican viewers.
In 2014, Egyptian remake debuted. Beelink Productions produced an Egyptian version in Arabic titled سيرة حب.

Plot
Diego Moreno is a 30-year-old tailor who has worked for several years in a men's clothing shop. Down on his luck, having recently broken up with his fiancée who also embezzled from him, he has temporarily moved back in with his parents. However, he is not as welcome as he expected.
Therefore, all of his loving is devoted to his family, and to his childhood friends Ferchu and Paco.
Shortly after he goes back to his parents’ house, Diego meets Julia Malaguer Podestá, with whom he falls in love. Julia, however, is engaged to Mauricio Doval, a successful businessman who hides his bloody business affairs behind his zealous defence of organic and natural products. Diego and Julia have a brief encounter; yet, due to various circumstances, they part company expecting to never meet again.

Diego becomes a very close friend of Martina Mansur, a woman who lost her small son two years earlier and believes that, somehow or other, Mauricio is to blame for the death. Martina finds no comfort to assuage her pain and makes up her mind to kill Mauricio. Diego finds out about her plans and, in order to prevent her from committing a crime, ends up saving Mauricio’s life.

Mauricio then wants Diego to work for him, almost as if he were a lucky charm, and he does not stop until he accomplishes his objective.
When Diego accepts and visits his new employer he discovers that Julia is Mauricio's wife.
Initially Diego is unaware of Mauricio’s true background; however, little by little, he learns of Mauricio’s deadly business.  Although, by then, knowing this will become too much of a burden for him. And when he feels like leaving the place, he will realize this is not possible. At least, it will not be possible for him to leave alive.

Besides, Diego will not dare to leave Julia by herself in the midst of the danger she still is unable to see. Julia does not know who Mauricio truly is, and she arranged for her father, the well-known scientist Alfredo Malaguer, to work with him.  Mauricio needs his scientific knowledge in order to carry out ambitious and dirty plans and had been after Malaguer even before meeting Julia. Diego will find himself facing a dilemma: whether to compromise with the truth and take advantage of it, or else to fight as if from within hell itself in order to change it.

Cast

See also 
 Amar Sin Limites
 Watch Over Me
 سيرة حب
 Resistirei

International releases

References

External links 
 

Golden Martín Fierro Award winners
2003 telenovelas
2003 Argentine television series debuts
2003 Argentine television series endings
Argentine telenovelas
Telefe telenovelas
Spanish-language telenovelas